The following is a list of characters that first appeared in the BBC soap opera EastEnders in 1997, by order of first appearance. Many were introduced by the show's executive producer, Jane Harris.

Neelam Kapoor

Neelam Kapoor is played by Jamila Massey.

Neelam and her husband built themselves a profitable clothing business but left it in the hands of their son, Sanjay (Deepak Verma), in the late 1980s and emigrated to their native India. However Sanjay proved to be a poor businessman and after some bad monetary investments, his business went bankrupt. Sanjay kept this from his parents and moves to Walford to open a clothing stall in 1993. In February 1997 Sanjay hears news that his father has died. He travels to India for the funeral and returns early in March with his mother in tow. Sanjay's wife Gita (Shobu Kapoor) is horrified. She had always had a tempestuous relationship with Sanjay's interfering mother and she is furious that he has brought her to live with them without her consent. Neelam, sensing Gita's disapproval, goes out of her way to be as obliging as possible and she is even understanding upon hearing the clothing business had floundered. Gita begrudgingly begins to accept Neelam's presence but finds her domineering mannerisms a little irksome.

Neelam helps with the running of the Kapoor's market stall, before buying the First Til Last grocery store in August 1997. Neelam is adamant that the shop should be run as a family business, so she fires the resident shop assistant, Carol Jackson (Lindsey Coulson). Neelam continues to irritate Gita as the year wears on by instructing her on the upbringing of her daughter, Sharmilla (Priya Bilkhu), and accusing her of being a bad wife to Sanjay. Sanjay allows Neelam to pamper him and cater to his every whim, which infuriates Gita further. By October Gita can take no more so she decides to leave Walford with Sharmilla for a holiday with her sister, but not before telling Neelam a few home truths about Sanjay's adultery before departing. Neelam is appalled, but she is only to happy to believe her precious son when he claims Gita was merely lying. Gita and Sharmilla are due to return in January 1998, but they go missing in suspicious circumstances and the police suspect foul play. It transpires that Gita had merely run away after falling pregnant with another man's baby. Sanjay tracks her down and Gita is persuaded to return to Walford with Sharmilla and her new baby. Neelam is furious about Gita's immoral behaviour and will not condone Sanjay taking on another man's child as his own. She tries to convince him to divorce Gita and fight for custody of Sharmilla. Sanjay defiantly refuses to do this, so Neelam sells her shop to Terry Raymond (Gavin Richards) and leaves Walford to live with her extended family in Bristol, disowning her son on the way out. Her last appearance is in July 1998.

Courtney Mitchell

Courtney Mitchell is the daughter of characters Grant Mitchell (Ross Kemp) and Tiffany Mitchell (Martine McCutcheon). From her on-screen birth in 1997 until 1998, Courtney is played by Charlotte Mitchell. Identical twins Carissa and Josephine O'Meara later took over the role. The character was written out of the soap when Kemp decided to quit. When Grant and Courtney return in 2006, Courtney is played by Megan Jossa until they depart once again in June that year. Courtney made an unannounced return on 4 August 2016, played by Alice Nokes, and departed on 9 September 2016.

Courtney is born prematurely by caesarean section in March 1997. At first it is unknown whether her father is Grant Mitchell or Tony Hills (Mark Homer), but a DNA test reveals that Grant is her father. Grant and Tiffany separate and Tiffany is about to leave with Courtney on New Year's Eve 1998, but while chasing Grant who has snatched Courtney, Tiffany is struck and killed by Frank Butcher's (Mike Reid) car. Grant and Courtney move to Rio de Janeiro in October 1999, and Courtney lives with her dad and stepmother Carla Mitchell (Christianne Oliveira).

Courtney returns to London on 27 March 2006 with Grant. Beyond mischievous, Courtney often refuses to do as she's told, backtalks, and argues with her cousin Ben Mitchell (Charlie Jones) which includes a schism between Peggy and Phil when the latter creates a family tree. Ben actually tells Courtney that her father killed her mother. Initially she refuses to believe Grant's claim that Tiffany's death was an accident. When Grant's wife Carla arrives, Courtney shows her blatant dislike. Grant decides that they should move to Portugal for a fresh start. But he dumps Carla on 9 June 2006 after discovering that she plans to fleece him and run off with another man, so just Grant and Courtney move to Portugal. In 2010, Courtney is heard on the phone to talking to her grandmother Peggy Mitchell (Barbara Windsor).

In August 2016, Courtney reads a text on Grant's phone from his sister-in-law and former wife, Sharon Mitchell (Letitia Dean), and meets her at a café, saying that Grant is not coming. Courtney asks why she and Grant were not invited to Peggy's funeral, to which Sharon says that they were. Courtney follows Sharon to the police station, where she sees Grant outside. Grant tells Courtney he got arrested for being drunk and rude to a police officer and takes an instant dislike to Belinda Peacock (Carli Norris) when Grant flirts with her. When they talk about the past, Grant tells Courtney that his brother Phil Mitchell (Steve McFadden) killed Peggy. Courtney storms off when Grant gets angry about her meeting Sharon. Annoyed with the lack of attention from Grant, Courtney refuses to let him stay with her. Courtney visits Phil and Sharon to see if they have heard from Grant as he owes her money, and Sharon gives Courtney some money. Courtney tells Sharon she knows what Phil did to Peggy, but Sharon tells her it is not true.

Courtney takes a liking to Mark Fowler (Ned Porteous), not knowing he is her half-brother, and they both admit at Shakil Kazemi's (Shaheen Jafargholi) party they like each other. Louise Mitchell (Tilly Keeper) tells Sharon about them, prompting her and Ian Beale (Adam Woodyatt) to find them. Sharon, Ian and Phil find out nothing happened between Courtney and Mark. Courtney and Louise merely become witnesses when the Mitchell house is being broken into in order for Ben and Jay Brown (Jamie Borthwick) to be kidnapped. Courtney and Louise both hide in the bedroom and in the midst of the panic, Courtney rings Grant for help during the struggle. Shortly afterwards Mark comforts Courtney only to be confronted by Grant who assumes he is one of the attackers. Grant tells Courtney that he is going back to Portugal and Courtney pretends not to care but later she catches up with Grant at the tube station and decides to go to Portugal with him.

Development
The character was originally played by infant Charlotte Mitchell from her on-screen birth until 1998. Mitchell was replaced by eighteen month old twins Carissa and Josephine O'Meara, after her persistent crying disrupted filming. A show spokesperson told Steven Murphy of Inside Soap that having twins play the role was better than relying on one baby all the time.

Jossa was surprised at her casting, saying: "I couldn't believe it when I heard I had got the part... it's going to be amazing and I can't wait." Described as "charming, intelligent yet spoilt", Courtney "loves being the centre of attention and hates sharing the spotlight with anyone".

Of her casting in 2016, Nokes said, "I was so excited [when I got the part]! To be a part of such an experienced cast and in one of the most renowned families in British soaps... it was a dream come true!" Nokes was unaware which part she was auditioning for as the scripts she was given had a different character's name. Nokes said that she is similar to Courtney, who is "very kind-hearted and very much like her mum, Tiffany. I think she's vulnerable but in an endearing way. However, Courtney is confident and likes to party!" She also added that Courtney "adores her dad and their relationship is strong. But I think she wants to hate him and teach him a lesson all the time. She feels like the adult in the relationship." Nokes confirmed she would appear in "a few episodes" and was not sure if she would return in the future, although Nokes seems keen to reprise the role on a full-time basis.

Polly Becker

Polly Becker, played by Victoria Gould, is a journalist who turns up in Albert Square in March 1997 to report the local happenings for the Walford Gazette. Author Kate Lock has described Polly as "hard-bitten, cynical, ambitious" and someone who "never allowed sentiment to get in the way of a good story." As well as reporting on the scandalous private lives of a few Walford residents, Polly is embroiled in a love triangle storyline with bi-sexual Tony Hills (Mark Homer) and gay Simon Raymond (Andrew Lynford). Tony cheats on Simon with Polly and according to the BBC, "the way the show portrayed Tony coming to terms with his bisexuality was widely praised".

Alex Healy

Alex Healy, played by Richard Driscoll, arrives in Walford as the local vicar. He runs a homeless shelter with the help of Christian follower Sarah Hills (Daniela Denby-Ashe), despite protests from many of the residents in Walford. Alex's most notable storyline is a love affair with Kathy Mitchell (Gillian Taylforth) who is married to Phil Mitchell (Steve McFadden). Discussing the storyline, Driscoll has suggested that Alex had been "wracked by emotional and spiritual turmoil ever since" sleeping with Kathy. He added, "Alex has got a lot of conflict. He's been suggesting to his father that he should work at his relationship with his wife – but there he is having an affair with a married woman. He feels a bit of a hypocrite – he feels guilty and ashamed. But the inescapable fact is he's attracted to Kathy. Something strange and wonderful happens to him when he's around her."

Annie Palmer

Annie Palmer, played by Nadia Sawalha, is the daughter of George Palmer (Paul Moriarty), and arrives to help George manage his dodgy businesses. A  '
tough-nut business woman', author Kate Lock has described her as "a rather terrifying creation, a kind of dominatrix without the dungeon. A verbal Miss Whiplash, she tore strips off anyone who crosses her." As well as managing various enterprises, Annie has a brief fling with Conor Flaherty (Seán Gleeson), and almost starts a relationship with Gianni di Marco (Marc Bannerman) until her father tells her that Gianni may be her half-brother. Annie later becomes involved with fellow businessman Steve Owen (Martin Kemp), but he eventually rejects her, leaving her humiliated.

Vanessa Carlton

Vanessa Carlton, played by Adele Salem, is a professional business woman who works for a property development company. Vanessa arrives at Deals on Wheels because she is looking for a reliable company like Evans Executive Cars to drive her company's clients round various commercial properties. Vanessa says she would like to speak to the owner who is Barry Evans, who is not present, but is telephoned by Robbie Jackson, to come to Deals on Wheels, as the only others present are Huw Edwards and Lenny Wallace. All three are trying to chat up Vanessa, but she is immediately wise to this and is not interested. When Barry arrives he and Vanessa go over to the Queen Victoria Public House for lunch to discuss potential business. Vanessa is most interested in the fact that Barry runs two businesses, (Deals on Wheels and Manor Wood), as Barry's father Roy Evans, has recently gone into semi-retirement and has handed the day to day running of the businesses over to Barry. She also seems interested that there is a lot of money involved in the businesses. Vanessa tells Barry that she has come to Evans Executive Cars as she has heard of their good reputation through one of her clients. Vanessa seems impressed and tells Barry that Evans Executive Cars has won the Contract she is offering. A romance quickly develops between Vanessa and Barry. Vanessa is shown to be smart, intelligent, bi-lingual, classy and sophisticated and as such Vanessa appears to be out of Barry's league. Barry himself is aware of this and initially feels insecure around her, but his confidence eventually begins to grow. This helped by continued encouragement from Vanessa. Barry for his part cannot believe his luck that someone like himself has a partner that is some like Vanessa and moves swiftly in terms of the romance.

Having known Vanessa for a little over two weeks, Barry declares his love for Vanessa, which Vanessa duly reciprocates. Barry then in a roundabout way suggests that he would like to sleep with Vanessa, but Vanessa tells him she would prefer to wait. Barry immediately follows this by saying that if she wants, he is prepared to wait until their wedding night. Vanessa is amazed that Barry is seriously suggesting they get married, which Barry says he wasn't serious about, but is if Vanessa is interested. Vanessa says she is interested in getting married. Shortly after this Barry tells Roy that he and Vanessa are planning on getting married. Roy is stunned as he is not even met Vanessa as he keeps missing Vanessa every time she turns up at the Vic. Roy warns Barry not to move too fast and to be careful with regard to how well he actually knows Vanessa. However Barry is sure that Vanessa is the woman for him. Vanessa next visits Barry at Deals on Wheels, the next day or a few days later and accepts Barry's marriage proposal. Vanessa finally gets to meet Roy and his wife Pat Evans at a dinner party that Roy is holding for a few friends at his house and Barry is invited brings Vanessa along as Roy has also invited Vanessa. Roy seems pleased to meet Vanessa, Pat less so, but this is probably because she has had a rather fraught day trying to organise the dinner party. The next day or so Barry and Vanessa discuss wedding plans ion the Vic. Barry wants to things properly and have "a big in your face wedding" and have a honeymoon in the South of France. Vanessa resists this as she says she wants to be with Barry now. Shortly after Barry and Vanessa announce to Pat and Roy that the wedding date is set for 1st November, which is only ten weeks or so away. Pat and Roy are supportive of the decision, especially Pat who has really taken to Vanessa. However Roy although happy for Barry is concerned that things are still moving too fast and is still urging Barry to be cautious and gies so far as to ask if Barry has met Vanessa's family yet. Barry is tiring of his Dad's wanting to tread carefully and tells Roy to "give it  a rest". The following day Vanessa arranges to meet Barry in the Vic. Roy asks Barry if he and Pat can meet Vanessa in the Vic as they would like the chance to get to know her better.
In the Vic Vanessa and Roy have a conversation where Vanessa quizzes Roy about how he started in business and built up his successful "empire" from nothing. Vanessa says she is interested because she is wanting to build something of her own and retire eventually just like Roy .

Roy says it is simply hard graft and take your chances , but says he is equally intrigued by Vanessa's world. Vanessa says that any time Roy wants a tour of her "humble little world", Roy only needs to let know. Roy immediately returns the compliment by saying that he will give Vanessa a tour of Manor Wood sometime. Roy then remembers he is visiting Manor Wood the next day and offers to take Vanessa with him. Vanessa enthusiastically accepts. When the day of the Manor Wood Tour arrives Vanessa has a talk in confidence with Roy. Vanessa says that she feels Barry is still trying to prove himself to his Father, because Roy is still to some degree involved in the businesses, especially Manor Wood, as Roy still likes keeping an interest in the place. Vanessa points out that Barry wants to prove himself, but can't because Roy won't relinquish full control and Roy won't relinquish full control until Barry proves himself. On Barry's Birthday Roy hands control of Manor Wood to Barry, surely as a result of Vanessa's conversation with Roy. Vanessa seems equally as thrilled as Barry that Roy has handed over control of Manor Wood to Barry. Just under two weeks after Barry's Birthday, Vanessa and Barry talk about the planning of their wedding. Vanessa tells Barry that she had a deal lined up and was going to use the money from it to fund a really classy honeymoon and it was going to be Vanessa present to Barry.
Vanessa says that she is trying to buy a hotel on the South Coast.  Vanessa tells Barry she has an investor that can put in 75% and needs to find the other 25% as the other two potential investors she had lined up have both pulled out and now she only has three weeks before her option runs out. Barry is intrigued and asks Vanessa how much she needs and Vanessa tells him that the amount outstanding is £35,000. Barry is amazed when Vanessa says that she feels that the Hotel in question is probably worth nine or ten times that amount. Barry seems interested but Vanessa says that the deal is out of Barry's league and advises him to save any money he has for her and any children they may have as a couple in the future. Barry seems surprised that Vanessa is talking about children already. Vanessa says she would like two girls and a boy and has some names lined up. Barry is still thinking about Vanessa's Hotel Deal.
Later Barry discusses the Hotel Deal with Vanessa saying that £35,000 is not a lot of money and is a drop in the ocean in business these days. Vanessa is sceptical saying that is a lot when you don't have it.
Barry suggests getting Roy to invest the £35,000, because Roy can invest the business through Manor Wood, as that business has the collateral. Vanessa refuses on the grounds that she has a golden rule never to invest with friends and family and also Roy is a car dealer. Barry replies that the deal is a business deal and that his father is a good businessman.
Vanessa wonders if Roy would even be interested, but Barry says he will be and that Vanessa should show Roy some figures and let Roy make a decision.
Barry eventually presents the proposition and figures regarding the Hotel Deal to Roy, who is intrigued enough to take a look and says that it is not really their sort of thing, but he will think about it.
Sometime later Barry meets Roy and Roy says he agrees that the Hotel Deal is a sound proposition, but he doesn't want to do anything.
Roy then says he doesn't want to do anything about it because he wants Barry to do it. Roy says that he thinks it's great that Barry has found something sound to put money into and wants Barry to do the deal, as Roy says it would unfair if he himself did the deal. Roy says he is proud of Barry for showing initiative and tells to do the deal and start earning the money.
With Roy's praise and endorsement ringing in his ears Barry rings Vanessa, but doesn't let on what Roy has decided, but tells her that he will let her know Roy's decision when they have a drink in their hands, but that the drink should be champagne.
Barry and Vanessa soon after set off to meet Vanessa's other investor in the Hotel Deal who is a gentleman in the city named Mr Joseph Marks.
When Barry meets Marks, Barry says he is keen to invest if they can agree the right terms. Marks asked Barry what line of business Barry is in.
Barry explains he runs the Car Lot and that he in charge of Manor Wood now his Father has retired. Vanessa also chips in saying that Manor Wood is doing very well, when Marks asks how the business is doing. Vanessa goes on to say that Barry also runs Evans Cars, which Barry points out  is an Executive Car Service. Vanessa backs Barry again by saying that the Car Service has a good list of clients which are top companies.
Despite this Marks is concerned that Barry is not the right sort of businessman for the Hotel Deal because he prefers his clients to come from the City end of the Business Community.
Marks explains that this is because the Hotel Developer a Mr Roberts is old fashioned in that he users no Contracts, does everything on a handshake and prefers cash and Marks is concerned that Mr Roberts will not see the world of cabs and second hand cars as quite the right one for investors in the Hotel. Marks confides in Barry and Vanessa that Mr Roberts is a bot of a snob.
Barry is affronted by this attitude and almost walks out. 
Vanessa makes a last ditch defence of Barry to Marks telling Marks that Marks is making a mistake letting Barry walk out and Vanessa will not recommend Marks to anymore of her associates.
Marks re-evaluates the situation and tells Barry that they appear to got off on the wrong foot and suggests they all have a drink.
Later Barry and Vanessa return to The Vic in the mood for celebration having come to a deal with Marks. Barry is revelling in the fact that everything seems to be going right for him and that in a few days time he will be a major investor in a prestigious Hotel.
Vanessa is still a little reluctant as the deal has not been concluded and as £35,000 is a lot of money tells Barry he can still pull out if he is not sure. Barry replies that he is sure and will not miss out on a golden opportunity and points out that if he did pull out Vanessa would lose her Commission as well as the faith of Marks who would not listen to her again.
As completion of the Hotel Deal approaches Roy expresses concern to Barry that he doesn't understand why such a big shot like Marks insists on cash.
Barry tells Roy to stop worrying as it is down to Mr Roberts the Developer who is a bit old fashioned.
Roy asks Barry if he is sure that the Deal is in place. Barry tells Roy that he has arranged it all with the bank and all Barry has to do is collect the money and go and deliver it.
On the day that the Hotel Deal is to be finalised and signed Barry is found by Roy in the Office of the Car Lot gloating over the £35,000.
As Barry puts the money in the safe Roy invites Barry and Vanessa out for lunch, but Barry declines on the basis that he doesn't think he can make it because the Hotel Deal has to be signed by 4:00pm that day or the whole Deal is off and there is a lot of travelling involved and Barry says that he will be cutting it fine as it is.
Roy persists and invites Barry and Vanessa for a quick drink instead, as Pat wants to sort out the arrangements for the wedding that is now only a month away.
Barry agrees and says they can tell Pat about the Hotel Deal at the same time, as she doesn't know about it. Roy who wants to tell Pat himself says they should wait until the whole thing is sorted.
Barry is somewhat crestfallen as well as annoyed and is convinced his Dad doesn't think he can pull the Deal off. Roy reassures Barry that he has absolute faith in Barry and knows he can pull it off.
Later Vanessa meets Barry in the Car Lot Office and tells him that she has arranged to meet Mr Roberts at 3:30pm. Barry is pleased as that means they have a drink in The Vic with Roy and Pat. Vanessa worries they will be late, but Barry promises they won't be.
When Roy, Pat, Barry and Vanessa are having drinks at The Vic, Roy tells Vanessa about life was like for himself and Barry after Barry's Mother died.
Roy says that for years all he did was build up the business, out early, back late and did not have time for relationships. Vanessa points out that Barry seems to followed in his Father's footsteps which Roy agrees with and sings Vanessa's praises by saying that she has turned Barry round and is the best thing that has ever happened to Barry. Vanessa seems embarrassed by this, but Roy declares that it is the truth.
Soon after Barry and Vanessa are about to leave when Vanessa gets a phone call.
Vanessa then has a private word with Barry and is in a state of shock. 
It turns out Marks is stuck in Frankfurt which is a stop over from Nairobi. As a result Marks will miss the 4:00pm deadline meaning the Deal is off. Barry asks if they can phone Mr Roberts and explain the situation and ask for more time, but Vanessa says that Mr Roberts would not agree to this and they will miss the deadline and lose the Hotel Deal.
Barry asks if Marks can wire his Bank and have the Bank give Vanessa the cash. Vanessa says that for that to happen Marks has to be there in person.
Running out of ideas Barry asks how much more money they need. Vanessa says it is everything they have and the amount needed is £105,000.
Barry suggests that he put all the money up himself, via Manor Wood. Barry says he can clear out the Accounts and borrow £80,000 against Manor Wood. The following day Marks gets his £105,000 out of his Bank gives to Barry who puts back into Manor Wood and no one is the wiser.
Vanessa says this is too risky, but Barry says business is all about taking risks and that he and Vanessa should take that risk.
Vanessa asks if they should ask Roy first. Barry considers for a moment and then decides that as he is in charge now he will do as he likes.
Barry and Vanessa arrive at Barry's Bank and Barry goes in to see the Bank Manager. Barry returns having obtained the additional £105,000 in cash, meaning that he now has the full £140,000 in cash for the Hotel Deal in his possession.
Vanessa is amazed and asks Barry how he did it.
Barry explains that he explained their situation to the Manager who said he would not help. Barry had then told the Manager that if he did not let Barry have the money, he (Barry) would be forced to close all his Account with the Bank. At this point according to Barry the Manager was throwing money at him.
Vanessa says Barry is a genius . Barry says he wouldn't go that far, but is feeling smug and is clearly very pleased with himself.
Barry asks what happens now and Vanessa says they need to split up. Barry is surprised, but Vanessa points out that Marks' plane arrives at 4:30pm, but she has to hand over the money to Mr Roberts at 4:00pm and she does not have time to do both.
Barry questions why Marks can't make his own way into town seeing as how it was Marks' who messed Barry and Vanessa about,; but Vanessa points out that they have to keep Marks' sweet and they don't want Marks' to drop out.
Barry seems to understand this and says he will pick Marks up. Vanessa offers to do this but Barry says that Mr. Roberts knows Vanessa but does not know him and if Barry meets Mr Roberts on his own, Mr Roberts may thing something dodgy is going on.
Vanessa concedes this point and gives Barry Marks' flight number and says that soon as she has delivered the money to Mr Roberts she will head back to The Vic for a celebratory drink.
Barry asks Vanessa to give him a call as soon as the Deal is done, because he won't relax until he gets Vanessa's phone call. Vanessa says she will phone Barry as he wants.
Vanessa then takes the briefcase full of money, hails a taxi and then departs.
Barry next arrives at the airport where Marks' flight is expected.
Upon arriving he realises to his frustration that he does not have his mobile phone. He had accidentally left it behind in The Vic. Roy had retrieved it and chased after Barry, but Barry had driven off to the Bank with Vanessa before Roy could catch him.
Barry checks the Boards for Flight arrives and is unable to find Marks' flight and so asks an airport attendant.
Barry gives the attendant the flight number of Marks' flight that Vanessa has provided.
The attendant checks and tells Barry that there is no flight with that flight number due in.
Barry persists and sis adamant that the flight is due, but the attendant is equally persistent and tells Barry that there is nothing from Nairobi on a Thursday and there never is.
Barry is now starting to get worried as he is realising that something isn't quite right.
Barry tries to call Vanessa on an airport payphone but cannot get through to her mobile number.
Barry next arrives at a petrol station and tries to use the payphone there, but is unable to do so as someone else is already using it.
Barry arrives back at The Vic and asks Tiffany Mitchell if Vanessa has been and Tiffany tells him that Vanessa hasn't been in all night.
Roy who is play darts with Pat meets Barry and returns Barry's mobile to him.
Barry asks Roy if he has had any calls and if any have been from Vanessa. Roy says he has plenty of calls, but none have been from Vanessa. Barry is still in a state although he tryinhg to keep it from Roy and asks Roy if he is sure Vanessa hasn't phoned. Roy confirms that he is sure Vanessa hasn't phoned.
Barry makes to leave. Roy is suspicious and asks Barry if everything went OK. Barry tells Roy that everything went just fine, but Roy is still wary.
Barry runs straight over to the Car Lot Office and checks the Answer Machine for messages, but there aren't any.
In desperation Barry rings Vanessa's mobile phone.
Vanessa is shown to be at the airport and answers her mobile phone, but does not speak.
Barry asks if it is Vanessa on the other end of the phone,  but Vanessa stonily faced and emotionless switches her phone off and snaps it shut.
Vanessa then heads through a Departure Gate, with the briefcase containing the £140,000 in cash and in her other hand an airline ticket.
Barry calls down the now dead phoneline for Vanessa and is left the dawning realisation that he has in fact been conned out of what is his Father's fortune.

Lorna Cartwright

Lorna Cartwright, played by Janet Dibley, is an alcoholic who meets Phil Mitchell (Steve McFadden) at an AA meeting and becomes "attached to him"; they begin a torrid affair, which ends badly. Lorna's principal purpose was to break up the marriage of Phil and his wife Kathy (Gillian Taylforth), which eventually happens. After being absent from August 1997, Lorna reappears once again in February 1998, and a suicide bid by her helps to ruin Phil and Kathy's chance of patching up their marriage, and Kathy leaves for a new life in South Africa.

Irene Raymond

Irene Raymond, played by Roberta Taylor, is the ex-wife of Ted Hills (Brian Croucher) and the estranged mother of Sarah and Tony Hills (Daniela Denby-Ashe and Mark Homer). Author Rupert Smith has stated that she is "flighty, bitchy and self-centred [...] the mother from hell", but has noted that she is a "breath of fresh air when compared to her ghastly children".<ref name="20years">{{cite book |last= Smith|first= Rupert|title= [[EastEnders spin-offs#Non-fiction books|EastEnders: 20 years in Albert Square]] |year=2005|publisher=BBC books|isbn=0-563-52165-1}}</ref> Irene is instantly paired romantically with Terry Raymond (Gavin Richards), and Rupert Smith has suggested that in Terry, Irene "met her match in dreadfulness" and likens them to a "geriatric Romeo and Juliet". He goes on to say that, "separately, the Hills and Raymonds were disastrous, dysfunctional families. Joined together, as they were by Terry and Irene's distasteful romance, they were unbearable."

Richard Crowe

Police Constable Richard Crowe, played by Simon Thomsen, is a police officer who first appears as the community liaison officer at a community meeting organised by Ian Beale (Adam Woodyatt). He later appears in 1999 to present Dot Cotton (June Brown) with an award, after she foils an attempted burglary at the surgery. He notices that Dot has (inadvertently) been making tea from cannabis, and arrests her.

Susan Rose

Susan Rose, played by Tilly Vosburgh, is the ex-wife of market inspector Michael Rose (Russell Floyd) and mother of Matthew Rose (Joe Absolom).

She arrives in Walford in 1997 along with her son Matthew. She suffers from multiple sclerosis and Michael and Matthew end up caring for her. Michael and Susan's relationship takes an upward turn as a result of this and they soon rekindle their relationship. When a new market inspector Lisa Shaw (Lucy Benjamin) arrives in Walford in late 1998, Michael becomes attracted to her, and soon after, he and Lisa start an affair. Michael ends the affair with Lisa within weeks after Susan wants Michael to move away with her to Leeds. Susan and Michael leave Walford together in 1999 and Susan is unaware of Michael and Lisa's fling. Although Michael occasionally returns to Walford later in the year to support Matthew when he is on trial for the murder of Saskia Duncan (Deborah Sheridan-Taylor), Susan does not return and has not been seen since.

Matthew Rose

Matthew Rose, played by Joe Absolom, is the son of Michael and Susan Rose (Russell Floyd and Tilly Vosburgh). Initially a sulky teenager, Matthew develops a friendship with club owner Steve Owen (Martin Kemp), and is present to witness Steve accidentally killing his ex-girlfriend Saskia Duncan (Deborah Sheridan-Taylor). 
A police investigation follows the discovery of Saskia's body, and Steve frames Matthew. Both Matthew and Steve stand trial for manslaughter. Steve is exonerated, but Matthew is found guilty and imprisoned.

Julie Haye

Julie Haye, played by Karen Henthorn, is the teacher of Clare Bates (Gemma Bissix). Julie falls in love with Clare's adoptive father, Nigel (Paul Bradley), whilst they are trying to sort the problematic youngster. A slow on/off romance develops between Nigel and Julie, but Nigel initially struggles with the guilt of moving on following the death of his wife a few years earlier. Faced with Nigel's uncertainty, Julie makes plans to leave Walford for a teaching job in Scotland; however, moments before she leaves, Nigel chooses to move to Scotland with her. They leave with Clare in April 1998.

Conor Flaherty

Conor Flaherty, played by Seán Gleeson, is first seen when his aunt Pauline Fowler (Wendy Richard) tracks him and his mother Maggie (Olivia Shanley) down in Ireland. Conor, and his daughter Mary (Melanie Clark Pullen) move to Walford with Pauline. He falls for Ruth (Caroline Paterson), the wife of Pauline's son, Mark (Todd Carty).  They eventually have an affair, leading to Ruth becoming pregnant with Conor's child.

Mary Flaherty

Mary Flaherty, played by Melanie Clark Pullen, is the daughter of Conor (Seán Gleeson). When her relatives, the Fowlers, go to Ireland to meet her family, Mary sees a chance to escape her alcoholic, violent grandfather Sean (Pat Laffin), and moves to Walford with them and her father. Mary struggles to settle in Walford, despite having a fling with Joe Wicks (Paul Nicholls), and then later getting involved with Matthew Rose (Joe Absolom) and Robbie Jackson (Dean Gaffney).

Maggie Flaherty

Maggie Flaherty, played by Olivia Shanley, is the sister of Pauline Fowler (Wendy Richard). Maggie was given up for adoption before Pauline was born, and Pauline only found out about Maggie years after their mother had died. Pauline and her family visit Maggie and her family in Ireland, and the sisters meet for the first time.

Sean Flaherty

Sean Flaherty, played by Pat Laffin, is the husband of Maggie (Olivia Shanley). When Maggie's sister, Pauline Fowler (Wendy Richard) and her family visit Maggie, it becomes clear to them that Sean is an abusive drunk, who is particularly harsh towards Mary (Melanie Clark Pullen), his granddaughter.

Eamonn Flaherty

Eamonn Flaherty, played by Maurice O'Donoghue, is the eldest son of Maggie and Sean Flaherty (Olivia Shanley and Pat Laffin). Eamonn is extremely loyal to his drunken father, and defends Sean's bullying to his long-lost cousin Ian Beale (Adam Woodyatt).

Brenda Flaherty

Brenda Flaherty, played by Janet Behan, is the wife of Eamonn (Maurice O'Donoghue), and mother to his children. Mary (Melanie Clark Pullen), Brenda's niece, lets it be known that Brenda is lazy, smelly and needs to take a bath.

Colette Flaherty

Colette Flaherty, played by Shiona Redmond, is the eldest daughter of Eamonn and Brenda Flaherty (Maurice O'Donoghue and Janet Behan). She has a brief holiday romance with her distant relative, Martin Fowler (James Alexandrou), whilst he and his family are visiting the Flahertys in Ireland.

Gerry McCrae

Gerry McCrae, played by Simon O'Gorman, is a married man who is secretly having an affair with Mary Flaherty (Melanie Clark Pullen). He tells Mary he is leaving his wife to be with her, but she ends their relationship, and moves to Walford.

Eamonn Flaherty Jnr

Eamonn Flaherty, played by Seán Walsh, is the son of Eamonn and Brenda Flaherty (Maurice O'Donoghue and Janet Behan). He witnesses his sister, Colette (Shiona Redmond), kissing Martin Fowler (James Alexandrou).

Jessie Moore

Jessie Moore, played by Chelsey Paden, had been put into foster care when her drug addict mother was imprisoned on remand for various offences. In October 1997 Jessie is housed with Mark and Ruth Fowler (Todd Carty and Caroline Paterson) in Walford. Six-year-old Jessie is a deeply troubled child, who is extremely shy and refuses to speak initially. She is also a bedwetter and Mark and Ruth seem unable to get her to open up to them, but they eventually manage to make progress and they become extremely attached to her.

In 1998, Jessie's mother, Nicole (Sara Stephens), telephones the Fowlers and asks for Jessie to visit her in prison. Mark refuses to allow this, but the social worker assures him that Nicole has completed her de-tox programme and that contact between her and Jessie is particularly important. Jessie visits and becomes excited to learn that Nicole will soon be released from prison. Nicole pays Jessie an impromptu visit on the day of her 7th birthday in February 1998. Nicole has found herself a bedsit and wants to take Jessie back. Mark and Ruth try to contest Nicole's decision, but they are told that reuniting children with their parents is what fostering is for. Nicole spends several weeks visiting Jessie to rebuild their relationship and eventually Ruth and Mark realise how close they are. They retract their opposition and Nicole gains custody but as to go into Court for this (and loses Access) as Ruth and Mark are pleased that Jesse chooses them

Ros Thorne

Ros Thorne, played by Clare Grogan, is a Scottish private detective whom Ian Beale (Adam Woodyatt) hires to trace his two sons, Steven and Peter. Steven and Peter had been taken by their mother, Cindy (Michelle Collins), following her failed attempt to have Ian killed by a professional hitman in 1996.

Ian and Ros discover that Cindy is residing in Italy and follow her there in November 1997. While hunting for Cindy, Ian and Ros become attracted to each other. They have a brief sexual encounter, though their relationship never progresses into anything serious as Ian is preoccupied with his children. After days of searching, Ros eventually finds Cindy working in an Italian bar and she and Ian concoct a plan to abscond with Ian's children. They lure Cindy into a trap, while Phil and Grant Mitchell (Steve McFadden and Ross Kemp) kidnap Steven and Peter and bring them to the airport to reunite with their father. Despite a few hitches, Ian manages to bring the children safely back to Walford, with Cindy in pursuit.

Cindy threatens to take Ian to court for custody of the children. Ian continues to use Ros to investigate Cindy and her new partner, Nick Holland (Dominic Taylor)—a rich businessman who is funding the custody case. Ros also begins investigating Ian's hitman, John Valecue (Steve Weston), who is now being held in prison for an unrelated murder. Valecue is unwilling to admit that Cindy hired him to kill Ian, as his sentence will likely increase if he admits to his involvement. However, after Annie Palmer (Nadia Sawalha) threatens him with severe repercussions from her associates within the prison, Valecue eventually confesses. Cindy is arrested and imprisoned, and Ian is given custody of his children. Ros is not seen again following the completion of the case.

Nick Holland

Nick Holland, played by Dominic Taylor, first appears when Cindy Beale (Michelle Collins) meets him in Italy while on the run after escaping from Walford with her children. They become lovers, and Cindy becomes pregnant with his child. When Cindy's former husband Ian Beale (Adam Woodyatt) tracks her down and steals the children back from Cindy and returns to Walford, Nick at first tries to help Cindy and comes with her back to Walford to get custody of the children. During the custody trial, Cindy is arrested for the attempted murder of Ian, and Nick realises what Cindy is really like. Nick returns to Italy after the trial ends. Cindy later dies while giving birth to Cindy Williams in prison, but Nick never returns for his daughter, and she is brought up by her grandmother Bev Williams (Diane Langton) and aunt Gina Williams (Nicola Cowper). In 2014, Cindy has a daughter, Beth Williams, making Nick a grandfather.

Josh Saunders

Josh Saunders is played by Jon Lee between 1997 and 1998.

Josh was introduced as part of a storyline to aid the departure of the long-running characters, Nigel and Clare Bates (played by Paul Bradley and Gemma Bissix). Actor Paul Bradley had decided to leave the serial, reportedly for fear of being typecast. The writers of EastEnders wanted to give Nigel a happy ending, so a character named Julie Haye (Karen Henthorn) was invented to be a love interest for Nigel, whilst her son, Josh, was invented to be a love interest for Nigel's daughter, Clare.

In one storyline, Josh celebrates his Bar Mitzvah. Rabbi Jonathan Black, who made a cameo in the serial's episode involving the event said "Ardent fans will know Josh did not want to celebrate his Bar Mitzvah but his father Eliot Saunders (Lawrence Lambert) and mother Julie felt it was important for him. So did his girlfriend who persuaded him to go ahead with it. Josh lives with his mother who converted to Judaism in a progressive congregation when she married his father, though now they are separated. They come together for a party, though there is a certain tension in the air." Black added: "I very much hope that Josh will now continue with our post-Bar Mitzvah course."

Josh, is played by Jon Lee, who went on to find greater fame as a singer in the successful pop group, S Club 7. Lee has said that he won a part in EastEnders'' "by complete accident really." He played the role of Josh for six months. As the storyline reaches its end, the Bates family join Josh and his mother for a new life in Scotland. Josh last appears in April 1998.

Storylines
Josh is first seen as a pupil rescuing Clare Bates from a gang of bullies—her former friends who become her enemies after she refuses to socialise with them. Clare develops an instant crush on Josh, and she spends the following few weeks trying to impress him. They start dating, despite initial objections from Clare's father, Nigel. It transpires that Josh is actually the son of Clare's teacher, Julie Haye. Clare is mortified by this initially, and she refuses to speak to Josh for a brief period. However, she soon comes to accept the situation, and is even pleased when her father begins dating Josh's mother.

Josh finds himself caught in the middle of his warring parents—his father, Eliot, is furious when Julie announces that she is planning to move to Scotland with Josh in 1998. Eliot is Jewish, and Josh is obliged to have a Bar Mitzvah to appease his father before he leaves for Scotland. Josh is initially opposed to this, as he is not remotely interested in religion. He starts missing his Bar Mitzvah tutorials, which does not please his father, but he ultimately decides to go ahead with the Bar Mitzvah. It takes place in March 1998 and Clare is present as his guest. Nigel and Julie's relationship ends when Nigel begins to have second thoughts, and Julie and Josh leave Walford for Scotland in April 1998. Clare is upset to see Josh go, they say their goodbyes, but just at the last minute, Nigel changes his mind again, and asks Julie if he and Clare can move to Scotland with her and Josh. Clare is overjoyed and Josh and Julie return to collect the Bateses a few weeks later.

Following Clare's return to Walford a decade later, in 2008, she reveals that as she had aged, Josh had taken her place in Nigel's affections.

Jeff Healy

Jeff Healy is played by Leslie Schofield. He was introduced in 1997, but was axed in 2000 by executive producer John Yorke.

Jeff is an atheist, who disapproves of his son, Alex (Richard Driscoll) being a vicar. He first arrives in Albert Square, after separating from his wife Jane Healy (Shirley Stelfox) in December 1997 to try and rebuild bridges with Alex. One of Jeff's daughters, Mel (Tamzin Outhwaite), makes a reappearance in his life and the three of them gradually begin living as a family again. Jeff has a brief courtship with Pauline Fowler (Wendy Richard) but is rejected when he proposes to her. Jeff leaves Walford in August 2000.

In 2019, he attends Mel's funeral off-screen.

Others

References

External links

1997
, EastEnders
EastEnders